Paulo Sérgio dos Santos Oliveira (born 1 June 1993) is a Brazilian athlete specialising in the long jump. He represented his country at the 2017 World Championships without qualifying for the final. In addition, he won the gold medal at the 2017 South American Championships.

His personal best in the long jump are 8.13 metres (-1.2 m/s) set in São Paulo in 2014. He also has a best of 16.52 metres in the triple jump (-1.2 m/s) from 2016.

International competitions

References

1993 births
Living people
Brazilian male long jumpers
Brazilian male triple jumpers
World Athletics Championships athletes for Brazil
Athletes (track and field) at the 2010 Summer Youth Olympics
South American Games silver medalists for Brazil
South American Games medalists in athletics
Athletes (track and field) at the 2018 South American Games
21st-century Brazilian people
20th-century Brazilian people